Jovellana punctata, or the teacup flower, is a perennial species of flowering plant in the family Calceolariaceae. It is native to central Chile.

Taxonomy 
This species is believed to have diverged from its New Zealand counterparts approximately 4.1Mya. It then diverged from Jovellana violacea about 1.0Mya.

Description 
Jovellana punctata is a semi-evergreen plant that has red stems with toothed, bright green leaves.

Its flowers are white, light pink or light lilac and can grow up to be 1.5m tall and can spread 0.6m.

It is said to have a minty-spicy fragrance.

Cultivation 
This plant can be propagated with stem tip cuttings.

It prefers to grow in loamless, fertile soil under direct sunlight. It should be watered regularly.

This species is said to grow well with Jovellana violacea, a closely related species.

References 

Flora of Chile
Lamiales